Opération Harmattan was the French participation in the 2011 military intervention in Libya. It was named for the Harmattan, which are hot dry winds that blow over the Sahara, mostly between November and March. The United States' counterpart to this was Operation Odyssey Dawn, the Canadian counterpart was Operation Mobile and the British counterpart was Operation Ellamy. The no-fly zone was proposed during the Libyan Civil War to prevent government forces loyal to Muammar Gaddafi from carrying out air attacks on anti-Gaddafi forces. Several countries prepared to take immediate military action at a conference in Paris on 19 March 2011.

French Dassault Rafale multirole fighters began reconnaissance missions on 19 March and were the first among the coalition to attack Libyan forces, destroying four tanks.

Deployed forces 

 French Air Force
 5 × Rafale fighters from EC 01.007 Provence, based at Naval Air Station Sigonella in Sicily, Italy
 6 × Mirage 2000-5 fighters from EC 01.002 Cigogne, Dijon – Longvic Air Base
 6 × Mirage 2000D fighter-bombers from EC 03.003 Ardennes, Nancy – Ochey Air Base
 2 × Mirage F1CR reconnaissance aircraft from ER 02.033 Savoie, Reims – Champagne Air Base
 6 × C135 aerial refueling planes from GRV 02.093 Bretagne, Istres-Le Tubé Air Base
 An E-3F AWACS plane from 36ème EDCA, Avord Air Base
 A C-160G SIGINT electronic surveillance aircraft from EET 01.054 Dunkerque, Metz-Frescaty Air Base
 Commando Parachutiste de l'Air companies 20 and 30 forward deployed to Solenzara Air Base, Corsica
 French Navy
 Task Force 473
 Aircraft carrier Charles de Gaulle (R91)
 10 × Rafale M fighters
 6 × Super-Etendard strike aircraft, from Flottille 17F
 2 × E-2C airborne early warning aircraft
 2 × Dauphin multipurpose helicopters
 2 × Alouette III utility helicopters
 French Air Force detachment of a Puma and 2 × Caracal transport helicopters
 Anti-air destroyer Forbin (D620) (later transferred to Operation Unified Protector)
 Anti-air destroyer Chevalier Paul (D621)
 Anti-air destroyer Jean Bart (D615)
 Anti-submarine destroyer Georges Leygues (D640)
 Anti-submarine destroyer Dupleix (D641)
 Anti-submarine destroyer Jean de Vienne (D643)
 Frigate Aconit (F713)
 Frigate Courbet (F712)
 Replenishment tanker Meuse (A607)
 Nuclear attack submarine Améthyste (S605)
 Landing helicopter dock Tonnerre (L9014)
 14 × Aérospatiale Gazelle
 4 × Eurocopter Tiger
 2 × Eurocopter Puma
 2 × Atlantique 2 signals intelligence aircraft based at Naval Air Station Sigonella in Sicily, Italy

Summary of action

Day 1: 19 March 

The French Navy anti-air destroyer Forbin and anti-air frigate Jean Bart were already off Libya when the operation commenced.

The French Air Force deployed in its first strike force eight Rafale fighters, two Mirage 2000-5 fighters and two Mirage 2000D fighter-bombers supported by other aircraft listed above.

Eight Rafale fighters patrolled the skies over Benghazi to prohibit the advance of Libyan ground forces. One opened fire on Libyan military vehicles at 16:45 local time. The Telegraph reported four Libyan tanks destroyed by French aircraft southwest of Benghazi.

Aircraft returning from combat missions landed at Solenzara Air Base on Corsica from which further combat sorties were launched.

Day 2: 20 March 
Eleven sorties were carried out by French aircraft over Libya.

Task Force 473, the aircraft carrier Charles de Gaulle and its battle group, sailed from Toulon.

Day 3: 21 March 
Up to this day, 55 sorties were carried out by French aircraft over Libya. The French Ministry of Defence (MoD) claimed a Mirage 2000-D destroyed another Libyan tank 100 km south of Benghazi.

Day 4: 22 March 
The number of combat aircraft forward deployed at Air Base 126 Solenzara was increased to 20 with the arrival of two more Mirage 2000-5 and two more Mirage 2000D, with support aircraft operating out of Saint-Dizier and Avord.

Day 5: 23 March 
Rafale and Mirage 2000D aircraft from Solenzara and Rafale and Super Etendard aircraft from the Charles de Gaulle conducted reconnaissance and support sorties over Libya.

Day 6: 24 March 
Rafale, Mirage 2000D and Super Etendard aircraft flew four joint interdiction missions against Libyan ground forces. A Rafale destroyed a Libyan Soko G-2 Galeb light attack jet with an AASM air-to-surface missile as it landed at Misrata. A patrol of two Mirage 2000Ds, equipped with GBU-12 laser-guided bombs, attacked loyalist artillery near Ajdabiyah.

Day 7: 25 March 
Qatari aircraft attached to Operation Odyssey Dawn and French aircraft conducted joint reconnaissance sorties in the regions of Misrata, Zintan, Sirte and Ajdabiyah. Four Mirage 2000Ds conducted interdiction missions against loyalist artillery near Ajdabiyah. Two French and two Qatari Mirage 2000-5s conducted air interdiction missions. Three French Mirage 2000-5s were moved from Solenzara to Souda Air Base on Crete.

Day 8: 26 March 
French aircraft carried out several air strikes around Zintan and Misrata, destroying at least five Soko G-2 Galeb light attack jets and two Mi-35 helicopters on the ground. French and Qatari Mirage 2000-5s continued joint reconnaissance sorties from Souda Air Base.

Day 9: 27 March 
Air Force and Navy Rafales attacked a command centre south of Tripoli. French and Qatari Mirage 2000-5s conducted joint patrols and air interdiction missions from Souda Air Base. The number of French Mirage 2000-5s based as Souda was increased to four.

Day 10: 28 March 
Air operations were planned to focus on the region around Zintan and Misrata. Mirage F1CRs conducted reconnaissance missions for the first time in the operation.

Day 11: 29 March 
Two joint patrols of French and Qatari Mirage 2000-5s conducted air interdiction sorties.

Day 12: 30 March 
A patrol of two French and four Qatari Mirage 2000-5s conducted air interdiction sorties.

Day 13: 31 March 
At 0600 GMT, NATO took command of all operations in Libya. Subsequent operations were conducted as part of Operation Unified Protector.

See also
Ouadi Doum air raid, 1986 French air raid on Libyan airbase in Chad
 Flottille 17F

References

External links 
 Official site of the French Ministry of Defense about Opération Harmattan
 Unofficial page about aircraft involved in Operation Harmattan
 Unofficial page about warships involved in Operation Harmattan
 Unofficial page about CVN Charles de Gaulle in Operation Harmattan

2011 in France
Foreign intervention in the First Libyan Civil War
France–Libya military relations
International security
March 2011 events in Africa
Military operations involving France
No-fly zone operations